29 Herculis is a single star located around 351 light years away from the Sun in the northern constellation of Hercules, a few degrees away from Omega Herculis. It has the Bayer designation h Herculis, while 29 Herculis is the Flamsteed designation. This star is visible to the naked eye as a faint, orange-hued point of light with an apparent visual magnitude of 4.84. It is moving further from the Earth with a heliocentric radial velocity of +3 km/s. The star has a relatively high proper motion, traversing the celestial sphere at the rate of 0.195 arc seconds per annum.

This is an aging giant star with a stellar classification of K4.5 III. It displays an enhanced abundance of elements generated through the alpha process, and, in particular, has a strong enhancement of silicon. 29 Herculis is a suspected variable star of unknown type, and has been measured ranging in visual magnitude from 4.82 down to 4.85. It is an estimated 6.53 billion years old with 1.19 times the mass of the Sun. Having exhausted the supply of hydrogen at its core, it has expanded to 42 times the Sun's radius. The star is radiating 384 times the luminosity of the Sun from its swollen photosphere at an effective temperature of 3,958 K.

References

K-type giants
Suspected variables
Hercules (constellation)
Herculis, h
Durchmusterung objects
Herculis, 029
149161
081008
6159